Hermann Vildalen (born 17 September 1995) is a Norwegian handball player for Drammen HK.

He played for Drammen HK and the Norwegian national team.

He is a nephew of former international handballer Preben Vildalen.

He is coach for Konnerud Handball Boys 15 years

References

Norwegian male handball players
Expatriate handball players
Sportspeople from Kristiansand
1995 births
Living people